Reformed Dutch Church of Blawenburg, now known as Blawenburg Reformed Church, is a historic church at 424 County Route 518 in the Blawenburg section of Montgomery Township in Somerset County, New Jersey. The Blawenburg Reformed Church Cemetery is located on County Route 601 near CR 518. The church was added to the National Register of Historic Places on July 22, 1985 for its significance in architecture and religion. It was added as a contributing property to the Blawenburg Historic District in 1990.

History
Construction of the church building started in 1830 and was completed in 1831. Richard Brown was the chief carpenter. It was then known as the Second Dutch Reformed Church at Harlingen. It then became the Reformed Dutch Church at Blawenburg on March 4, 1832. A schoolhouse was built in 1853 by the church. It is now the village preschool.  The church cemetery is west of the church on land partly donated by John Van Zandt in 1859.

Description
The church is a two story white building, an example of late Georgian architecture. It has a bell tower with a feather-shaped weathervane on top. The facade features an oculus and two pie-shaped windows. There are two entrance doors.

Notable burials
 David F. Weeks (July 31, 1874 – March 15, 1929), football player, coach, and doctor
 John Allan Wyeth (October 24, 1894 – May 11, 1981), World War I veteran, war poet, and painter

See also
 National Register of Historic Places listings in Somerset County, New Jersey

References

External links
 
 

Montgomery Township, New Jersey
Reformed Church in America churches in New Jersey
Churches on the National Register of Historic Places in New Jersey
Georgian architecture in New Jersey
Churches completed in 1831
19th-century Reformed Church in America church buildings
Churches in Somerset County, New Jersey
National Register of Historic Places in Somerset County, New Jersey
Religious organizations established in 1832
New Jersey Register of Historic Places
Historic district contributing properties in New Jersey
Individually listed contributing properties to historic districts on the National Register in New Jersey